R336 road may refer to:
 R336 road (Ireland)
 R336 road (South Africa)